Vladimir Borisovich Antipov (born January 14, 1978) is a Russian former professional ice hockey player who was last signed to play for CSKA Sofia in the Bulgarian Hockey League (BHL).

Playing career
Antipov began playing for Torpedo Yaroslavl, playing on their junior team.  He was then drafted 103rd overall by the Toronto Maple Leafs in the 1996 NHL Entry Draft and Antipov was promoted to the senior team.  In 1999, Antipov signed with the Maple Leafs organization and in a two-year stay he had spells in the American Hockey League with the St. John's Maple Leafs, the ECHL with the South Carolina Stingrays and the International Hockey League with the Long Beach Ice Dogs but never managed to play in the National Hockey League.

Antipov soon returned to Russia and re-signed with Yaroslavl who changed their name from Torpedo to Lokomotiv.  Antipov would be ever present with the team for the next five seasons until 2006 where he signed for Salavat Yulaev Ufa.

Career statistics

Regular season and playoffs

International

External links
 

1978 births
Living people
People from Apatity
Lokomotiv Yaroslavl players
Long Beach Ice Dogs (IHL) players
Russian ice hockey left wingers
Salavat Yulaev Ufa players
Severstal Cherepovets players
South Carolina Stingrays players
St. John's Maple Leafs players
Toronto Maple Leafs draft picks
Traktor Chelyabinsk players
Sportspeople from Murmansk Oblast